St Hilda's Church is in Bilsborrow Lane in the village of Bilsborrow, Lancashire, England. It is an active Anglican parish church in the deanery of Garstang, the archdeaconry of Lancaster, and the diocese of Blackburn. Its benefice is united with those of St Mary the Virgin, Goosnargh, St Lawrence, Barton, St Eadmer, Bleasdale, and St James, Whitechapel, to form the Fellside Team Ministry.

History

St Hilda's was built in 1926–27, and designed by Henry Paley of the Lancaster firm of architects Austin and Paley at a cost of £11,640 (equivalent to £ in ). The foundation stone was laid by the Rt Revd William Temple, then the Bishop of Manchester (later the Archbishop of Canterbury).

Architecture

The church is constructed in stone with a slate roof. The architectural style is Free Perpendicular. It has a low tower at the crossing, with a stair turret at its southeast corner, and texts inscribed above the bell openings. Inside the church, the pulpit is decorated with carvings of vines. The stained glass includes two windows by Shrigley and Hunt dating from the 1960s or 1970s. The two-manual pipe organ was built in 1938 by Wilkinson of Kendal. There is a ring of eight bells, all cast in 1949 by Mears and Stainbank of the Whitechapel Bell Foundry.

See also

List of ecclesiastical works by Austin and Paley (1916–44)

References

Church of England church buildings in Lancashire
Diocese of Blackburn
Austin and Paley buildings
Gothic Revival church buildings in England
Gothic Revival architecture in Lancashire
20th-century Church of England church buildings
Churches completed in 1927
Hilda, Bilsborrow